The Model Collection is a collection of 1945–1946 local provisional stamps of Germany issued following the allied occupation, unused and on covers that forms part of the British Library Philatelic Collections. It was formed by Dr Walther Model von Thunen and donated to the British Museum in 1956.

See also
Foreign Office Collection
Postage stamps and postal history of Germany

External links
British Library article on the Model Collection.

References

British Library Philatelic Collections
Philately of Germany